"Element" (stylized as "ELEMENT.") is a song by American rapper Kendrick Lamar, from his fourth studio album Damn, released on April 14, 2017. The fourth track on the album (eleventh on the Collector's Edition of Damn), the song was written by Lamar, Sounwave, James Blake, and Ricci Riera and produced by Sounwave, Blake, and Riera, with additional production by Tae Beast and Bēkon. The song charted in multiple countries in 2017.

Background 
The song was first introduced by basketball player LeBron James on his Instagram story when he filmed himself dancing to the song prior to Damn release.

Lyrics 
The track opens with a skit from Kid Capri, who refers to Lamar as "Kung Fu Kenny". Afterwards Kendrick Lamar repeats the phrase "I don't give a fuck", before the first verse starts.

Some sources have interpreted the song as a diss track on American rappers Big Sean and Drake. However, Andres Tardio of Rap-Up has stated the song's hook as a possible diss on Drake, Big Sean, or American recording artist Jay Electronica.

The second verse of the song has been described to have a resemblance to Lamar's "The Heart Part 4", a song also theorized to have contained lyrics that diss Drake and Big Sean. The second verse as follows:

Production 
The song features production from musician and producer James Blake. Ricci Riera, who previously worked as a producer on the Lamar-Schoolboy Q collaboration "Collard Greens", also worked as producer for the song. The song contains a sample of "Ha" by rapper Juvenile from his third studio album 400 Degreez.

Music video
The song's accompanying music video premiered on June 27, 2017 on Lamar's Vevo channel on YouTube. The video was directed by Jonas Lindstroem and The Little Homies (pseudonyms for Lamar himself and Dave Free).

Described as violent and powerful, the music video contains powerful imagery, some of which contains direct references to photographs of civil rights photographer, musician, writer, and director Gordon Parks. The video also mimics the imagery from the music video for "Humble", the first single from Damn.

The music video has received positive reviews. Lawrence Burney of noisey called the video "the masterpiece you anticipated."

Critical reception 
Joe Price of Pigeons and Planes named "Element" as one of the best songs of the week, the week of April 14, 2017, saying the song has "memorable verses and a sticky hook over some sparse but gorgeous production." Continuing, Price says "Element" is "a prime example of what makes Damn an immediately appealing body of work that is just as rewarding as his more challenging output." Meave McDermott of USA Today, in a positive review, said the song "still sounds sharp and unforgiving even when he's coining catchphrases."

Live performances 
Lamar performed "Element" for the first time live at the Coachella Valley Music and Arts Festival on April 23, 2017. His performance at Coachella was highly acclaimed, with the L.A. Times describing his performance as "simple, yet powerful."

Lamar has performed "Element" on the Damn tour.

Credits and personnel 
Credits adapted from the official Damn digital booklet.
Kendrick Lamar – songwriter
Mark Spears – songwriter, producer
James Blake – songwriter, producer
Ricci Riera – songwriter, producer
Tae Beast – additional production
Bēkon – additional production
Kid Capri – additional vocals
Matt Schaeffer – mixing
James Hunt – mixing
Derek  Ali – mixing
Tyler Page – mix assistant
Cyrus Taghipour – mix assistant
Zeke Mishanec – additional recording
Brendan Silas Perry – additional recording

Charts

Weekly charts

Year-end charts

Certifications

References 

2017 songs
Kendrick Lamar songs
Songs written by Kendrick Lamar
Songs written by Sounwave
Songs written by James Blake (musician)
Diss tracks